This a tabular display of all years in heavy metal music, to provide an overview and quick navigation to any year.

2000s in heavy metal music
2000   2001   2002   2003   2004   2005   2006   2007   2008   2009
2010   2011   2012 2013 2014 2015 2016 2017 2018 2019
2020 2021 2022

1900s in heavy metal music
1960s
1970   1971   1972   1973   1974   1975   1976   1977   1978   1979
1980   1981   1982   1983   1984   1985   1986   1987   1988   1989
1990   1991   1992   1993   1994   1995   1996   1997   1998   1999

Timelines of heavy metal
Tables of years